No Kyung-tae (born September 20, 1986) is a South Korean football player.

Club career 
On November 18, 2008, he was one of sixteen priority members to join Gangwon FC. He made his debut for Gangwon against Daegu FC on April 8, 2009 in league cup match.

Club career statistics

References

External links
 

1986 births
Living people
South Korean footballers
Gangwon FC players
K League 1 players
Association football defenders